Culver Creek may refer to:

Culver Creek (Ohio)
Culver Creek (Pennsylvania), a tributary of Shickshinny Creek